David Noonan (born 1969) is an Australian artist who lives and works in London.

His work was shown at Tate Modern in 2006.

Early life and education
Noonan was born in Ballarat, Victoria, Australia. He received his BFA (Painting) in 1989 from Ballarat University College and his MFA in 1992 from Victorian College of the Arts, Melbourne.

Work

His work was included in the March 2020 Adelaide Biennial of Australian Art at the Art Gallery of South Australia, which was titled "Monster Theatres".

Solo exhibitions
2020
Stagecraft, Art Gallery of Ballarat, Ballarat, VIC, Australia
2019
Tapestries, Anna Schwartz Gallery, Melbourne, VIC, Australia
A Dark and Quiet Place, Fremantle Arts Centre, Fremantle, WA, Australia
2018
A Dark and Quiet Place, Gertrude Contemporary, Melbourne, VIC, Australia
2017
A Dark and Quiet Place, Modern Art, London
2016
Lead Light, Roslyn Oxley9 Gallery, Sydney, NSW, Australia
2015
Roslyn Oxley9 Gallery, Sydney, NSW, Australia
Rosenwald-Wolf Gallery, University of the Arts, Philadelphia, PA, USA
Xavier Hufkens, Brussels, Belgium
2014
Au 8, Rue Saint-Bon, Paris, France
2013
Foxy Production, New York, NY, USA
Collages, Au 8, Rue Saint-Bon, Paris, France
Roslyn Oxley9 Gallery, Sydney, NSW, Australia
2012
Modern Art, London
Origami, Xavier Hufkens, Brussels, Belgium
2011
Contemporary Art Museum, St. Louis, MO, USA
Roslyn Oxley9 Gallery, Sydney, NSW, Australia
2010
David Kordansky Gallery, Los Angeles, CA, USA
SPIEL, Washington Garcia (off-site), The Mitchell Library, Glasgow
2009
Australian Centre for Contemporary Art, Melbourne, VIC, Australia
2008
Baronian Francey, Brussels, Belgium
Chisenhale Gallery, London
MARKUS, Roslyn Oxley9 Gallery, Sydney, NSW, Australia
Art : Concept, Paris, France
2007
Palais de Tokyo, Paris, France
2006
David Kordansky Gallery, Los Angeles, CA, USA
2005
Images, Roslyn Oxley9 Gallery, Sydney, NSW, Australia
Four New Films, Govett-Brewster Art Gallery, New Plymouth, New Zealand
Films and Paintings 2001–2005, Monash University Museum of Art, Melbourne, VIC, Australia
HOTEL, London
2004
they became what they beheld, Foxy Production, New York, NY, USA
they became what they beheld, Three Walls, Chicago, IL, USA
Paintings, Uplands Gallery, Melbourne, VIC, Australia
2003
Before and Now, Roslyn Oxley9 Gallery, Sydney, NSW, Australia
Miriam Hall, (with Starlie Geikie), Clubs Projects Inc., Melbourne, VIC, Australia
SOWA (with Simon Trevaks), Artspace, Sydney, NSW, Australia
SOWA (solo and collaboration with Simon Trevaks), Foxy Production, New York, NY, USA
2002
Waldhaus, Uplands Gallery, Melbourne, VIC, Australia
The Likening (with Simon Trevaks), Roslyn Oxley9 Gallery, Sydney, NSW, Australia
2001
The Likening (with Simon Trevaks), Studio 12, 200 Gertrude Street, Melbourne, VIC, Australia
2000
more apt to be lost than got (with Simon Trevaks), Roslyn Oxley9 Gallery, Sydney, NSW, Australia
1998
Saturn Return, 1st Floor, Melbourne, VIC, Australia
1997
head on, Karyn Lovegrove Gallery, Melbourne, VIC, Australia
head on, Centre for Contemporary Art, Adelaide, SA, Australia
1995
Karyn Lovegrove Gallery, Melbourne, VIC, Australia
1993
POOL, Karyn Lovegrove Gallery, Melbourne, VIC, Australia
Type 1-36, 200 Gertrude Street, Melbourne, VIC, Australia

Selected collections
Gallery of Ballarat, Ballarat, VIC, Australia

Art Gallery of New South Wales, Sydney, NSW, Australia

Art Gallery of Ontario, Toronto, Canada

Art Gallery of South Australia, Adelaide, SA, Australia

Art Gallery of Western Australia, Perth, WA, Australia

British Council, London

CAA Art Museum, China Art Academy, Hangzhou, China

Center for Curatorial Studies, Bard College, Annandale-on-Hudson, NY, USA

Charles Riva Collection, Brussels, Belgium

City of Stonnington, Melbourne, VIC, Australia

Dallas Museum of Art, Dallas, TX, USA

Depart Foundation, Rome, Italy

Galerie de l’UQAM, Montréal, Canada

Les Abbatoirs, Toulouse, France

Los Angeles County Museum of Art, Los Angeles, CA, USA

Mona – Museum of Old and New Art, Hobart, TAS, Australia

Monash University Museum of Art, Melbourne, VIC, Australia

Museum of Contemporary Art Chicago, Chicago, IL, USA

Museum of Contemporary Art, Sydney, NSW, Australia

The Museum of Modern Art, New York, NY, USA

National Gallery of Australia, Canberra, ACT, Australia

National Gallery of Canada, Ottawa, Canada

National Gallery of Victoria, Melbourne, VIC, Australia

RISD Museum, Rhode Island School of Design, Providence, RI, USA

Saatchi Gallery, London

Solomon R. Guggenheim Museum, New York, NY, USA

TarraWarra Museum of Art, Healesville, VIC, Australia

University of Ballarat Art Collection, Ballarat, VIC, Australia

Whitney Museum of American Art, New York, NY, USA

Zabludowicz Collection, London

References

Further reading 
Tufnell, Rob. "Origami," in David Noonan: Origami (Brussels: Xavier Hufkens) 2012.
Baran, Jessica. "David Noonan," Art in America, December 2011.
Noonan, David. "Scenes." Helen Macpherson Smith Commission, 2009.
Higgie, Jennifer. "David Noonan: Seven scenes among many." Art & Australia, Vol. 46, No. 1, Spring 2008: 112–119.
Noonan, David (images) and Dan Fox (text). "Pageant." New York: Foxy Production, 2007.
Portfolio by David Noonan, Palais de Tokyo / Magazine 02, Spring 2007: 57–72.
Gronlund, Melissa. "Future Greats: David Noonan." Art Review, Issue 09, March 2007: 78-79, 95.
Taft, Catherine. "David Noonan." Modern Painters, December 2006: 117.
Myers, Julian. "David Noonan." Frieze, November/December 2006: 166.
Laster, Paul. "David Noonan." Art Asia Pacific, Winter 2005: 51–57.
Higgie, Jennifer. "David Noonan, Films and Paintings 2001–2005." Monash University Museum of Art, Melbourne, 2005.
Fahey, Johannah. "Before and Now: The Work of David Noonan." Eyeline. Number 58, Spring 2005: Cover Image, 42-44.
Molon, Dominic. “They Became What They Beheld.” Chicago Three Walls, 2004.

1969 births
Living people
Australian contemporary artists
People from Ballarat